Swansea is a city and county in Wales.

Swansea may also refer to:
Swansea City Centre
Swansea Urban Area
City and County of Swansea council, the local council for Swansea
District of Swansea, one of the four local government districts of West Glamorgan, Wales from 1974 to 1996
Swansea City A.F.C., a Championship club based in Swansea, Wales
Swansea RFC, a Welsh Rugby Union club based in Swansea, Wales
Swansea Valley

Australia
Swansea, Tasmania
Swansea, New South Wales

Canada
Swansea, Toronto, a community in Toronto

Jamaica
Swansea Cave

United States
Swansea, Arizona (ghost town)
Swansea, California (ghost town)
Swansea, Illinois
Swansea, Massachusetts
Swansea, Nevada (ghost town)
Swansea, South Carolina
Swansea Vineyards, a winery in New Jersey

Music
 "Swansea", a song by Joanna Newsom from The Milk-Eyed Mender